The French Provisional Ministry of 1830 was announced on 1 August 1830 by Louis-Philippe d'Orléans in his capacity as Lieutenant General of the kingdom.
It replaced the Paris Municipal Commission Ministry announced the day before after the revolution in which the Bourbon Restoration monarchy was deposed. 
On 11 August 1830 it was replaced by the First ministry of Louis-Philippe.

Ministers

On 1 August 1830 Louis-Philippe first announced that the ministers named by the Paris Municipal Commission should retain their positions.
Later that day he announced various changes.
The ministers were:

References

Sources

French governments
1830 establishments in France
1830 disestablishments in France
Cabinets established in 1830
Cabinets disestablished in 1830